Khama Rhino Sanctuary is a community based wildlife project in Botswana. The animal shelter was established in 1992 to assist in saving the vanishing rhinoceros, restore the historic wildlife populations and provide economic benefits to the local Botswana community through tourism and the sustainable use of natural resources. Covering approximately 8585 hectares of Kalahari Sandveld, the sanctuary provides prime habitat for white and black rhinos as well as over 30 other animal species and more than 230 species of birds.

History 
In 1989 a group of Serowe residents conceived the idea of a wildlife reserve near Serowe. Serwe Pan, then a cattle post, had been a traditional hunting area teeming with wildlife. The residents wished to re-establish it to its earlier state. In 1993 the Ngwato Land Board allocated the land around Serwe Pan to the Khama Rhino Sanctuary Trust.

Fauna

Mammals 
The Sanctuary is home to other wildlife which have settled naturally or been translocated in. This includes zebra, blue wildebeest, giraffe, eland, springbok, impala, gemsbok, kudu, steenbok, duiker, red hartebeest, leopard, ostrich, African wild cat, caracal, small spotted genet, black-backed jackal, bat-eared fox, brown hyena.

Birds 

Over 230 bird species have been identified at the sanctuary. Including Abdim's stork and the bearded woodpecker.

Conservation 

The main conservation project undertaken by Khama Rhino Sanctuary is the rhino breeding program. To date, the sanctuary has relocated 16 rhinos to different places within the country from a founder population of four animals. The long term goal of the Sanctuary is to let the rhinos safely breed within its borders and re-introduce them into their natural wild habitats. The rhinos within the sanctuary are secured by anti-poaching patrols carried out by the rangers and the Botswana Defense Force.

References 

National parks of Botswana
Wildlife sanctuaries